Josef Hader (born 14 February 1962) is an Austrian comedian, actor, and writer.

Life and career
Hader was born in Waldhausen im Strudengau, Upper Austria and grew up in Nöchling in Lower Austria where he attended the Stiftsgymnasium Melk. During this time he made his first comedy attempts at his school. After his civilian service at the Red Cross he started studying German and History. As a student he began working on his first comedy programme Fort Geschritten. His second programme Der Witzableiter und das Feuer won the prestigious Salzburger Stier comedy award. After aborting his study and writing Biagn und Brechen (1988) and Bunter Abend (1990) he celebrated his breakthrough with the tragicomic play Indien, together with the comedian Alfred Dorfer, which was filmed by Paul Harather in 1993 with Josef Hader himself in the leading role.

With the film Indien and his following shows Im Keller (1993) and Privat (1994) he became one of the most successful and most respected comedians in the German-speaking world. His comedy programme Privat is the most successful comedy in Austrian history. His most recent show called "Hader muss weg" is more acting than comedy. Hader plays seven different roles using no props other than a simple Trenchcoat and acts only through gestures, voice and facial expression.

Since then, Hader has starred in commercially successful films such as Komm, süßer Tod (2000), Silentium (2004) and The Bone Man (2009), while also gaining critical acclaim for his performances in dramas such as Der Überfall (2000) or Ein halbes Leben (2008). Among others awards, he received the Best Actor Award at the Locarno International Film Festival, the Romy Award, the Adolf Grimme Award and the German Television Award.

He is a regular guest on various German Comedyshows, such as Neues aus der Anstalt on ZDF, Scheibenwischer on Das Erste, Quatsch Comedy Club on Pro Sieben or Ottfried Fischer's Ottis Schlachthof on Bayerischer Rundfunk which increased his popularity in Germany.

Hader is the father of two sons.

Comedy and plays
1982: Fort Geschritten
1985: Der Witzableiter und das Feuer
1986: Im milden Westen
1987: Tausche Witze gegen Geld
1988: Biagn oder Brechen
1990: Bunter Abend
1991: Indien (with Alfred Dorfer)
1993: Im Keller
1994: Privat
1997: Hader spielt Hader
2004: Hader muss weg

Filmography

Awards

1985: Salzburger Stier
1986: Österreichischer Kleinkunstpreis
1990: Deutscher Kleinkunstpreis
1992: Österreichischer Kleinkunstpreis
1993: Deutscher Kabarettpreis
1993: Förderpreis zur Kainz-Medaille 
1994: Platinum album for the CD Privat
1994: Platinum album for the VHS tape Privat
1999: Nestroy Ring
2000: Locarno International Film Festival – Best Actor
2001: Romy Award for Komm, süßer Tod
2009: Diagonale Acting Award
2009: Deutscher Fernsehpreis (German Television Award)
2010: Nomination for the Goldene Kamera
2010: Adolf Grimme Award
2010: Das große Kleinkunstfestival (Berlinpreis) 
2010: Romy Award for The Bone Man
2011: Bayerischer Kabarettpreis (Hauptpreis)
2011: Göttinger Elch
2017: Dieter Hildebrandt Prize
2022: Österreichischer Kabarettpreis

See also
Kabarett
Cinema of Austria

References

External links

 
Website of Josef Hader
kabarett.at – Kabarett in Austria

Josef Hader at Harald Schmidt Show (YouTube.com)

1962 births
Living people
People from Perg District
Austrian comedians
Austrian male film actors
Austrian male television actors
Austrian screenwriters
Austrian film directors
20th-century Austrian male actors
21st-century Austrian male actors